The Great Western Railway (GWR) 7800 Class or Manor Class is a class of 4-6-0 steam locomotive. They were designed as a lighter version of the Grange Class, giving them a wider Route Availability. Like the 'Granges', the 'Manors' used parts from the GWR 4300 Class Moguls but just on the first batch of twenty. Twenty were built between 1938 and 1939, with British Railways adding a further 10 in 1950. They were named after Manors in the area covered by the Great Western Railway. Nine are preserved.

Background
Although successful mixed-traffic designs, neither the Hall nor the Grange 4-6-0 classes were able to cover the full range of duties previously undertaken by the 4300 Class 2-6-0 locomotives due to their ‘red’ weight classification. By the late 1930s a lighter version of the Grange class was urgently required for those cross-country and branch line duties forbidden to heavier locomotives. A new lighter (Swindon No.14) boiler was therefore designed, and as with the Grange Class, the driving wheels and motion components were recovered from withdrawn members of the 4300 Class. The Manor class, with an axle loading of just over 17 tons, could be utilised on many lines from which the heavier Granges were barred.

Building
The first of the Manors No.7800 Torquay Manor was built at Swindon Works and entered traffic in January 1938. By February 1939 twenty were in service but the outbreak of World War II forced the cancellation of construction of a further batch of twenty locomotives. However, after nationalization, the newly created Western Region of British Railways was authorized to build ten more of the class. Nos. 7820–29 at Swindon in November and December 1950. A batch of ten other locomotives was planned to be released, but the batch was cancelled due to unknown reasons. The cancelled list of Manor locomotives includes the following: 7830 Norton Manor, 7831 Ogwell Manor, 7832 Pimley Manor, 7833 Ramsbury Manor, 7834 Rodley Manor, 7835 Standen Manor, 7836 Sutton Manor, 7837 Thorton Manor, 7838 Widford Manor, and 7839 Wilcote Manor.

Performance
Unlike the Granges of 1936 where the use of a standard design and the re-use of existing components had produced a masterpiece, the initial performance of the Manors was comparatively mediocre. ‘Were it not for the constraints of war there is every reason to expect that Swindon would have recalled the engines for modifications’
There was no attempt to improve the steaming; a British Railway edict permitted construction only of existing pre-nationalisation designs. Subsequent trials showed the engines did not require too much work to correct their faults. Internal alterations to the blastpipe and an increase in air space in the firegrate added to the new type of narrow chimney noticeably improved the draughting. After trials on ten of the class, the improvements became standard after July 1954.

Operations

The first examples were despatched to depots at Wolverhampton, Bristol, Gloucester, Shrewsbury, Westbury in Wiltshire and Neyland in South Wales. In October 1938 No.7805 Broome Manor underwent clearance tests between Ruabon and Barmouth. Subsequently, the class were used over the main lines of the erstwhile Cambrian Railways, with its headquarters and works in Oswestry. The Manors were also successfully employed in the West Country where they were used for banking and piloting trains over the Devon banks between Newton Abbot and Plymouth. Their light axleloading also allowed them across the Tamar Bridge and on to the branch lines of Cornwall.

By 1959 twenty-one Manors were congregated in Mid- and South Wales. Their most prestigious working was the Cambrian Coast Express, where a Manor took over from a King or Castle at Shrewsbury and worked through to Aberystwyth. Others of the class operated in the Birmingham, Gloucester and Hereford areas while the handful stationed at Reading frequently ventured on to the Southern Region line to Guildford and Redhill.

Withdrawal 
The first Manor to be withdrawn was No.7809 Childrey Manor, of Shrewsbury depot in April 1963 and which was cut up at Swindon. By May 1965 the numbers had been halved and the final two in service, No.7808 Cookham Manor of Gloucester, and No.7829 Ramsbury Manor of Didcot, were condemned in December 1965. Remarkably, for a relatively small class where thirty engines were built, nine examples have been preserved. All of which were withdrawn from British Railways service in 1965.

Preservation

Operation in preservation 

Nine members of the Manor class have survived into preservation with four being GWR built engines and five being BR built examples. One member of the class 7808 Cookham Manor was purchased directly from BR service for preservation by the Great Western Society. The remaining eight engines were all rescued from Barry Scrapyard with the first member of the class 7827 Lydham Manor being rescued in Jun 1970 and left as the 5th departure from Barry Scrapyard. The last member of the class to be rescued from Barry Scrapyard being 7828 Odney Manor being rescued in Jun 1981 leaving as the 133rd departure.

All nine members of the Manor class have operated at some point in their preserved career and of the nine Manors to survive in preservation, all four of the GWR built Manors have seen main line operation: Nos. 7802 Bradley Manor, 7808 Cookham Manor, 7812 Erlestoke Manor and 7819 Hinton Manor.

In the 1970s, no. 7808 Cookham Manor was used by the Great Western Society (GWS) to haul nine vintage ex-GWR carriages on an annual outing on the main line from Didcot to Birmingham. Today 7808 is on static display inside the GWS shed at Didcot awaiting an overhaul.

7812 Erlestoke Manor only worked a small number of railtours between April and June 1982. Also certified for main line operation in the 1980s was fellow SVR based engine 7819 Hinton Manor. It worked a number of railtours along former Great Western routes including the Cambrian Coast Line & played a big part in 1985 during the 150th anniversary of the Great Western Railway. 7812 was until New Year's Eve 2017 operational on the SVR but wasn't main line certified and 7819 was until Aug 2018 on static display in Swindon, the engine is now on static display inside The Engine House awaiting an overhaul.

7802 Bradley Manor was the last and most recent member of the class to have operated on the national network, being withdrawn from the mainline in 2007 following the requirement that mainline certified steam engines had to have OTMR fitted by the end of the year. Its last overhaul was completed in November 2015, however it was not certified to operate on the main line.

None of the BR built Manors have operated on the main line in preservation.

Locomotives 

See: List of GWR 7800 Class locomotives for all Manor locomotives built. Nine locomotives have been preserved:

Model railways

Mainline Railways had OO gauge Manor Class models in their catalogue in 1983, with a model of Cookham Manor in GWR green and a retooled model of Lydham Manor in BR lined green. Mainline's tooling was later used by Bachmann Branchline, but is not currently in production. Both Dapol and Accurascale released 00 gauge renditions of the 78xx in fall of 2022.

Prior to 2011, Ixion Models created a model of the 78xx in N scale. Dapol purchased the rights to produce the Ixion 78xx in 2011.

See also 
 List of GWR standard classes with two outside cylinders

References

External links 

 GreatWestern.org page
 Dinmore Manor website
 Erlestoke Manor Fund website

 
4-6-0 locomotives
7800
Railway locomotives introduced in 1938
Standard gauge steam locomotives of Great Britain
2′C h2 locomotives
Passenger locomotives